Shanti Deep English School is a private English-medium school located at Dang, Nepal. It was founded in 1994 (2051 B.S.). The founder of this school is Govinda Bahadur Shah. Shanti Deep currently provides education to students from Nursery level to Grade 10.

School Leaving Certificate 
Shanti Deep has started providing SLC examination from 2070 BS.

Students passing the School Leaving Certificate examination:

References

See also 
 List of schools in Nepal

Secondary schools in Nepal
Buildings and structures in Dang District, Nepal
1994 establishments in Nepal